"I'm Broken" is a song by American heavy metal band Pantera from their seventh album, Far Beyond Driven. It was the first single issued from the album. Kerry King said on the Japanese TV show Rock Fujiyama (featuring guitarist Marty Friedman) that it's his favorite guitar riff.

Meaning
The song is about the back pain that Pantera's vocalist Phil Anselmo felt. Phil Anselmo said "This is right when I started feeling the pain in my lower back, and it felt scary," says Anselmo. "I think this is one of the first times in my life, man, that I had this thing called 'vulnerability' kick in, and that was a very uncomfortable feeling." Anselmo adds, "I think that was really my first glimpse into kind of screaming to the world, 'Fucking... I am broken! Somebody fucking help me here!'"

Origin

Pantera's guitarist Dimebag Darrell spoke about the song saying:

""I'm Broken" was a sound check riff – one of them ones where I'd walk in with a hangover from ripping it up night after night with everyone in every town. That's where a lot of the best riffs I ever wrote came from. I just played the first riff I thought of, Vinnie started kickin' in on it, Rex joined in – we didn't write the entire song on the spot, but we kept toying with it and finally worked on it once we got into the studio."

Release and reception

"I'm Broken" was released as the band's first single for Far Beyond Driven. Two versions of the single were released. Both contained the B-side "Slaughtered", but each version included a differing pair of live tracks. All live tracks were recorded in Moscow, USSR at the Monsters of Rock concert in 1991. The single garnered the band its second top 40 UK hit, reaching number 19 on the UK Singles Chart, making it the band's highest charting single worldwide. It also reached number 49 on the Australian Singles Chart and number 32 on the Swedish Singles Chart. The song was also nominated for Best Metal Performance at the 1995 Grammy Awards. AllMusic reviewer Eduardo Rivadavia called "I'm Broken" a "wisely chosen first single".

Live performance
A live version of the song can be found on the band's live album Official Live: 101 Proof. During live performances of the song, the band would have Dimebag Darrell performing backup vocals and would end the song with the outro of "By Demons Be Driven".

Cover art
The covers for parts one and two each show half of Pantera vocalist Phil Anselmo's face. When compared, it can be seen that they are a mirror image of one another, and on part two of the single, the colors are inverted.

Track listing
CD single one ("I'm Broken/Slaughtered" part one)
All tracks written by Pantera
"I'm Broken" – 4:25
"Slaughtered" – 3:57
"Domination" (live) – 6:33
"Primal Concrete Sledge" (live) – 3:56

CD single two ("I'm Broken/Slaughtered" part two)
All tracks written by Pantera
"I'm Broken" – 4:25
"Slaughtered" – 3:57
"Cowboys from Hell" (live) – 5:10
"Psycho Holiday" (live) – 5:49

Covers
 "I'm Broken" was covered by Malefice for Metal Hammers Dimebag Darrell tribute album, Getcha' Pull: A tribute to Dimebag Darrell.
 "I'm Broken" was covered by Trepalium on their fourth album, H.N.P.

Appearances in the media
 The song was released as downloadable content for Rock Revolution and Rock Band 3.
 It is a playable track in Guitar Hero: Warriors of Rock.
 The music video was featured on Beavis and Butt-Head on the episode "The Pipe of Doom", where it received a rave response from the duo.
 The song was featured in a Carl's Jr. and Hardee's television commercial, starting in December 2015. The commercial features a burger flying through the air after the song's opening riff.
 As of February 4, 2020, the song is used as the opening theme for the National Wrestling Alliance digital series NWA Power.

Charts

References

External links
Official music video

1994 singles
1994 songs
Pantera songs
Song recordings produced by Terry Date
Songs written by Dimebag Darrell
Songs written by Vinnie Paul
Songs written by Phil Anselmo
Songs written by Rex Brown